2,5-Dihydrofuran is an organic compound classified as a monounsaturated derivative of furan.  It is a colorless, volatile liquid.  It can be produced by the rearrangement of the epoxide of butadiene.

2,5-Dihydrofuran is a component of vitamin C.

References

Dihydrofurans